Stella Atal (born ), is a Ugandan painter and fashion designer, who is the founder, owner and chief executive of Atal Stella Fashion House, with locations in Paris, France.

Background and education
She was born in the Northern Region of Uganda, along the northern shores of Lake Kyoga. Stella started her schooling in Kampala, Uganda's capital and largest city. She relocated to Kenya and continued her education there. Later, she completed her education in the United Kingdom. She has a bachelors and a master's degree in Fine Art.

Career
In 2007, she started her own label, Atal Stella. There she focuses on using what is locally available, including eco-friendly, natural and re-cycled material. Her designs have showcased at the Africa Fashion Week New York, in 2010 and at the Green Fashion Switzerland, in 2011. Stella's work has been featured in two issues of the prestigious Italian Vogue magazine.

In 2016, she relocated from Kampala, Uganda to Paris, France. The following year, she received a license that allows manufacturing and selling of her branded clothes and copyrighted art pieces in France and the rest of the European Union. She tours internationally in Continental Europe, United Kingdom and the United States.

Other considerations
Stella Atal won the African Designer of The Year award by the Ethical Fashion Awards, held in London in 2008. In 2010 she won the Afric Collection Fashion Award in Douala, Cameroon.

She lectures to art students and fashion designer students. She also works with refugees and disadvantaged youth, particularly girls. In addition, she works with HIV/AIDS patients both in Kampala and in the Northern Region of the county.

See also
 Sylvia Owori
 Santa Anzo
 Anita Beryl

References

External links
 Stella Atal: Paris Based Ugandan Fashion designer to Showcase At the 7th Diaspora Gala in Kampala As of 25 September 2017.

People from Northern Region, Uganda
Living people
1980s births
Langi people
Ugandan fashion designers
Ugandan women fashion designers